Roger Elton Welsby (born 28 May 1951 in St Helens, Lancashire) is an English television sports presenter.

Welsby is a fan of Everton Football Club, and St Helens R.F.C.

Broadcasting career 
Welsby began his broadcasting career on Liverpool radio station Radio City as a sports reporter and commentator. In January 1978 he joined Granada Television, working on its football programme The Kick Off Match and presented its 1980s successors Match Night (if shown on a Saturday) and Match Time (if broadcast on a Sunday) until their demise in 1983. Welsby was primarily a presenter, but did occasionally deputise as commentator. During that time he also presented RL Action taking over from Bob Hall and later Richard Madeley. He was also involved with World of Sport as a reporter for On The Ball and later as a relief presenter, becoming part of the ITV team in the major international football tournaments for the 1982 World Cup and the 1986 World Cup he was a reporter and was ITV's co-presenter based in Italy in the 1990 World Cup, a reporter/interviewer in the 1988 European Championship he is remembered for the interview with the then UK Sports Minister Colin Moynihan before the England v Ireland match, lead presenter in the 1992 European Championship and was the newsreader and occasional relief presenter on Midweek Sports Special.

When Granada revived Kick Off in 1989 after a six-year absence, Welsby returned as presenter despite by then presenting networked shows. He was one of the anchors of the 1988 Seoul Olympics, the last Olympic Games to be covered by the network, and also presented the Saturday afternoon Results Service from October 1985 until May 1992, and was the sole anchor throughout its seven years on air.

Welsby occasionally presented live matches for ITV in 1986, becoming the regular host in the 1987–88 season. At the start of the 1988–89 season, ITV began broadcasting exclusive live coverage of the Football League. It was the task of Greg Dyke to oversee the coverage and he entrusted Welsby as presenter of The Match, anchoring numerous dramatic matches over the next four years, including Arsenal's 2–0 win against Liverpool in the last game of the season which saw the Gunners snatch a last minute winner at Anfield.

The loss of top flight football to Sky Sports in 1992 hit ITV Sport hard, and Welsby's final work as ITV's lead football presenter was at the 1992 European Championship. After this, he ceased working for ITV Sport and returned to Granada full-time.

Welsby continued to present regional programming for Granada, including Granada Goals Extra, The Granada Match, the station's crown green bowls coverage, and the midweek sports programming until May 2000 when the station decided not to renew his contract. In an interview in 2015 Welsby was critical of Soccer Sunday, the last programme he presented, describing it as a "poor show with poor content and poor journalistic standards".

Welsby occasionally returned as a guest on the Granada Soccer Night programme, and in 2001 he went back to radio to present Elton Welsby's Soccer Saturday for North-West regional station Century FM – a role he held for three years.

Other work
Welsby was the final presenter of British gameshow Busman's Holiday following on from Julian Pettifer and Sarah Kennedy. He also presented the quiz show  Go For Goal in 1993. He is regularly involved in corporate and charity work.

Welsby's most recent TV work was as a presenter of Crown Green Bowls for Sky Sports during the mid-2000s.

Welsby is active on Twitter, where his handle is @WelsbyElton and he occasionally appears as a guest on football and rugby league YouTube fanzine channels. His son, Chris Welsby, is a producer of Premier League football coverage on beIn Sports, presented by Richard Keys and Andy Gray.

References

1951 births
Living people
British sports broadcasters
People educated at Liverpool College
People from St Helens, Merseyside
Television presenters from Liverpool